Sicaya Municipality is the third municipal section of the Capinota Province in the Cochabamba Department in Bolivia. Its seat is Sicaya.

Subdivision 
Sicaya Municipality is divided into two cantons.

See also 
 Kuntur Wachana

References 

  Instituto Nacional de Estadistica de Bolivia  (INE)

External links 
 Population data and map of Sicaya Municipality

Municipalities of the Cochabamba Department